Santo Domingo Norte is a municipality of the Santo Domingo Province in the Dominican Republic. There is one municipal district (distrito municipal) within the municipality: La Victoria.

Overview
Santo Domingo Norte was created as a municipality in 2001 by Law 163-01 splitting the Santo Domingo province from the Distrito Nacional including those parts of metropolitan Santo Domingo north of the Isabela River.

See also
List of municipalities and municipal districts of the Dominican Republic

References

Populated places in Santo Domingo Province
Municipalities of the Dominican Republic